Figueira de Lorvão is a parish in Penacova Municipality, Portugal. The population in 2011 was 2,737, in an area of 26.68 km².

References

External links
  

Freguesias of Penacova